Johannes Wallmann (21 May 1930 – 2 January 2021) was a German Protestant theologian and emeritus professor of church history at the Ruhr-Universität Bochum.

Bibliography 
 Martin Brecht, Johannes Wallmann, Oswald Bayer: Festschrift für Johannes Wallmann zum 65. Geburtstag: Ein Jahrbuch zur Geschichte des neueren Protestantismus. Vandenhoeck & Ruprecht, 1996,

Selected publications 

Co-editor of the yearbook Pietismus und Neuzeit and the Hallesche Forschungen.

 Kirchengeschichte Deutschlands seit der Reformation. Mohr Verlag, Tübingen, 1993, 4., durchges. Aufl., 
 Der Pietismus. Vandenhoeck und Ruprecht, Göttingen, 2005, 
 Johannes Wallmann und Udo Sträter (Hrsg.): Halle und Osteuropa : zur europäischen Ausstrahlung des hallischen Pietismus. Niemeyer-Verlag, Tübingen, 1998, 
 Philipp Jakob Spener und die Anfänge des Pietismus. Mohr Verlag, Tübingen, 1986, 2., überarb. u. erw. Aufl., 
 Der Theologiebegriff bei Johann Gerhard und Georg Calixt. Mohr (Siebeck) Verlag, Tübingen, 1961, Erschien auch als Diss., Zürich
 Theologie und Frömmigkeit im Zeitalter des Barock, Gesammelte Aufsätze, Mohr Siebeck, Tübingen 1995,

References

External links 
 Works on or by Wallmann in the Deutschen Nationalbibliothek
 Official website (in German)

20th-century German Protestant theologians
1930 births
2021 deaths
Deaths from the COVID-19 pandemic in Germany
Writers from Erfurt
Academic staff of Ruhr University Bochum
German male non-fiction writers